Ecionemia is a genus of sea sponges belonging to the family Ancorinidae.

This genus is characterized by a high density of siliceous spicules. Members of this genus are known to be eaten by hawksbill turtles.

Species
The following species are recognised in the genus Ecionemia:

Ecionemia acervus Bowerbank, 1862
Ecionemia alata (Dendy, 1924)
Ecionemia arabica (Lévi, 1958)
Ecionemia australiensis (Carter, 1883)
Ecionemia baculifera (Kirkpatrick, 1903)
Ecionemia cinerea Thiele, 1900
Ecionemia demera (Laubenfels, 1934)
Ecionemia densa Bowerbank, 1873
Ecionemia nigra Sollas, 1888
Ecionemia novaezealandiae (Dendy, 1924)
Ecionemia obtusum Lendenfeld, 1907
Ecionemia spinastra Lévi, 1958
Ecionemia thielei Thomas, 1986
Ecionemia walkeri (Laubenfels, 1954)

Bibliography

References

Tetractinellida
Taxa named by James Scott Bowerbank
Sponge genera